Ryvingen may refer to:

 Ryvingen Lighthouse, a lighthouse located on an island off the coast of Mandal, Norway
 Ryvingen Peak, a rock peak in Queen Maud Land, Antarctica